Philippe de Chauveron (born 15 November 1965) is a French film director, and writer. He is best known for his 2014 film Serial (Bad) Weddings.

Filmography

Directing

Film

References

External links

1965 births
Living people
French film directors
French male screenwriters
French screenwriters